Men's discus throw events for amputee athletes were held at the 2004 Summer Paralympics in the Athens Olympic Stadium. Events were held in two disability classes.

F42

The F42 event was won by Fanie Lombaard, representing .

Result
22 Sept. 2004, 19:30

F44/46

The F44/46 event was won by Daniel Greaves, representing .

Result
20 Sept. 2004, 17:00

References

M